JFW may refer to:
 Jafarwala railway station, in Pakistan
 Jakarta Fashion Week
 Jamaica Federation of Women
 JAWS for Windows
 Junior Forest Wardens